Avenging Bill is a 1915 American film featuring Oliver Hardy.

Cast
 Mabel Paige as Lucy
 Royal Byron as Mr. Grouch
 Eloise Willard as Mrs. Grouch
 Oliver Hardy as Bill, the Grocer's Boy (as Babe Hardy)

See also
 List of American films of 1915
 Filmography of Oliver Hardy

External links

1915 films
1915 short films
American silent short films
Silent American comedy films
American black-and-white films
1915 comedy films
American comedy short films
1910s American films
1910s English-language films